Sir Tsun-nin Chau, CBE (22 December 1893 – 27 January 1971) was a prominent Hong Kong businessman and politician.

Honours
He was designated a Commander of the Most Excellent Order of the British Empire in 1938 and was knighted in 1956. He is also an Associate Officer of the Venerable Order of the Hospital of St. John of Jerusalem.

References

1893 births
1971 deaths
Members of the Executive Council of Hong Kong
Members of the Legislative Council of Hong Kong
Members of the Sanitary Board of Hong Kong
Members of the Urban Council of Hong Kong
Hong Kong collaborators with Imperial Japan
Hong Kong businesspeople
Barristers of Hong Kong
Alumni of The Queen's College, Oxford
Members of the Middle Temple
Commanders of the Order of the British Empire
Officers of the Order of St John
Knights Bachelor